La Tène is a municipality in the Swiss canton of Neuchâtel. It may also refer to:

 La Tène culture, an Iron Age archaeological culture
 La Tène (archaeological site), the type site of the La Tène culture